Uropterygius concolor is a moray eel found in coral reefs in the Pacific and Indian Oceans. It was first named by Rüppell in 1838, and is commonly known as the unicolor snake moray, uniform reef-eel, brown reef-eel, brown moray eel, or the brown moray. It is mostly dull brown in colour, with the tip of the tail being yellow.

References

External links
 

concolor
Fish described in 1838